

Overview 

The 2007 UCI Mountain Bike & Trials World Championships were held in Fort William, United Kingdom from 4 to 9 September 2007. It was a new experience for everyone involved since jt was the first time the World Championships of this kind had been held in the United Kingdom. The Fort William site in the Scottish Highlands had been used regularly for rounds of the UCI Mountain Bike World Cup since 2002.

The disciplines included were cross-country, downhill, four-cross, and trials. The event was the 18th edition of the UCI Mountain Bike World Championships and the 22nd edition of the UCI Trials World Championships.

France finished on top of the medal table with 6 world champions and 13 medals overall, including a fourth consecutive world title for Julien Absalon in the elite men's cross country. Sam Hill and Sabrina Jonnier won their second consecutive world titles in the men's and women's elite downhill.

Medal summary

Men's events

Women's events

Team events

Medal table

See also
 UCI Mountain Bike Marathon World Championships

References

External links

 
 
 
 Results for the mountain bike events on CyclingNews.com
 Results for the trials events on UCI.ch

UCI Mountain Bike World Championships
International cycle races hosted by Scotland
UCI Mountain Bike and Trials World Championships
Mountain biking events in the United Kingdom
2007 in Scottish sport